Queenie Smith (September 8, 1898 – August 5, 1978) was an American stage, television, and film actress.

Life and career
Smith was born in Texas. Her family moved from Texas to New York shortly before Smith began studying at the Metropolitan Opera's ballet school. She got an early start, being trained in ballet and dance and spent her teen years performing as a dancer with the Metropolitan Opera Company in operas such as Aida, La Traviata, and Faust. By the 1920s she was appearing on Broadway in shows such as Helen of Troy, New York (1923), Sitting Pretty (1924), and The Street Singer (1929), and by the mid-1930s had made her way into films. She also appeared on Broadway in Tip-Toes (1925). She costarred in the 1936 Universal Pictures film version of Jerome Kern's Show Boat, playing Ellie May Chipley. Smith replaced stage actress Eva Puck who had starred as Chipley in the 1927 premiere and 1932 revival of Show Boat.

In 1947 she appeared in the film The Long Night and then played other character roles on film, and later, television. She was seen as Jimmy Durante's wife in The Great Rupert, and in guest shots in many television shows, including The Hardy Boys/Nancy Drew Mysteries, A.E.S. Hudson Street, Rhoda, Dawn: Portrait of a Teenage Runaway, Barney Miller, Mother, Jugs & Speed, Chico and the Man, McMillan & Wife, Love American Style, The Waltons, Here's Lucy, The Funny Side, Hawaii Five-O, The Monkees, The Odd Couple, The Love Boat, Maude and Little House on the Prairie (in a recurring role as Mrs. Whipple).

Smith was a teacher and mentor to many a young actor. She taught at the Hollywood Professional School and was the director for the training program at Melodyland Theater in Anaheim, California, during the 1960s.

She worked until the year of her death, her last role being Elsie in the Chevy Chase/Goldie Hawn film Foul Play. (1978). She died of cancer a month before her 80th birthday.

Partial filmography

John Halifax, Gentleman (1915) - Minor Role (uncredited)
Mississippi (1935) - Alabam
Special Agent K-7 (1936) - Ollie O'Dea
Show Boat (1936) - Elly May Chipley
On Your Toes (1939) - Mrs. Dolan
From This Day Forward (1946) - Mrs. Beesley
The Killers (1946) - Mary Ellen 'Queenie' Daugherty (uncredited)
Nocturne (1946) - Queenie
The Long Night (1947) - Mrs. Tully
Sleep, My Love (1948) - Mrs. Grace Vernay
The Snake Pit (1948) - Lola
Massacre River (1949) - Mrs. Johanssen
The Great Rupert (1950) - Mrs. Amendola
Caged (1950) - Mrs. Warren - Marie's Mother (uncredited)
Union Station (1950) - Landlady (uncredited)
Prisoners in Petticoats (1950) - Beatrice
Emergency Wedding (1950) - Rose - Reno Hotel Maid (uncredited)
Belle Le Grand (1951) - Anna (uncredited)
The First Legion (1951) - Henrietta
When Worlds Collide (1951) - Matron with Cigarette (uncredited)
The Greatest Show on Earth (1952) - Spectator (uncredited)
My Sister Eileen (1955) - Alice - Baker's Secretary (uncredited)
Fighting Trouble (1956) - Miss Kate Kelly
You Can't Run Away from It (1956) - Elderly Lady
Hot Shots (1956) - Mrs. Kate Kelly
Hold That Hypnotist (1957) - Kate Kelly
Sweet Smell of Success (1957) - Mildred Tam (uncredited)
The Legend of Lylah Clare (1968) - Hairdresser
The Day of the Locust (1975) - Palsied Lady
Hustle (1975) - Customer #1
Mother, Jugs & Speed (1976) - (uncredited)
Invisible Strangler (1978) - Darlene's Landlady
The End (1978) - Old Lady in Car
Foul Play (1978) - Elsie (final film role)

References

External links

1898 births
1978 deaths
American stage actresses
American television actresses
American film actresses
20th-century American actresses
Actresses from New York City
Deaths from cancer in California